The Metro Alpin is an underground funicular situated above the Swiss town of Saas Fee, in the canton of Valais. Opened in 1984, it links the Felskinn cable-car station ( MSL) on the shore of the Fee Glacier to the Mittelallalin in the north flank of the Allalinhorn.

The Metro Alpin is the highest funicular in the world. Being a fully underground railway, it is also considered the highest subway in the world.

See also 
List of buildings and structures above 3000 m in Switzerland
List of funicular railways
List of funiculars in Switzerland

References

External links 
 
 Saas-Fee website
 Saas Fee Bergbahnen AG - mountain transportation company operating the Metro Alpin
 Article on Funimag

Funicular railways in Switzerland
Transport in Valais
Railway lines opened in 1984
Underground railways